Fort Shelby was a United States military installation in Prairie du Chien. Illinois Territory, built in 1814. It was named for Isaac Shelby, Revolutionary War soldier and first governor of Kentucky. The fort was captured by the British during the Siege of Prairie du Chien in July 1814. The British renamed the fort Fort McKay after Major William McKay, the commander of the forces that won the battle. Fort McKay remained under British control until 1815, when the British destroyed it before leaving the area. Fort Crawford was built on the same site in 1816.

Notes

Prairie du Chien, Wisconsin
Buildings and structures in Crawford County, Wisconsin
Shelby
Pre-statehood history of Wisconsin
1814 establishments in the United States